Claudia Salcedo Quezada (born 19 July 1980) is a Chilean cross-country skier, biathlete, and roller skater. She is a member of the Chilean military in addition to sports. She competed for Chile at the 2018 Winter Olympics in cross-country skiing.

References 

1980 births
Living people
Cross-country skiers at the 2018 Winter Olympics
Chilean female cross-country skiers
Olympic cross-country skiers of Chile
Place of birth missing (living people)
21st-century Chilean women